WLJC-TV (channel 65) is a television station licensed to Beattyville, Kentucky, United States, serving the Lexington area as an affiliate of the digital multicast network Cozi TV. The station is owned by local minister Margaret Drake and her ministry, The Hour of Harvest, Inc. WLJC-TV's studios are located on Radio Station Loop north of Beattyville, and its transmitter is located on Tip Top Road.

History
The station first signed on the air on October 18, 1982 and claims to be the oldest Christian television station in Kentucky. The Hour of Harvest, Inc. also owns two Christian radio stations, Air 1 outlet WLJC-FM and K-LOVE outlet WEBF.

On April 2, 2018, WLJC began carrying a half-hour local newscast produced by Lexington ABC affiliate WTVQ at 9 p.m. titled ABC 36 News at Nine on WLJC.

In November 2018, WLJC's main channel began airing Cozi TV programming (which moved from 65.6; that subchannel now airs Start TV).

Technical information

Subchannels
The station's digital channel is multiplexed:

Analog-to-digital conversion
WLJC-TV shut down its analog signal, over UHF channel 65, in July 2007. The station's digital signal remained on its pre-transition VHF channel 7. Through the use of PSIP, digital television receivers display the station's virtual channel as its former UHF analog channel 65, which was among the high band UHF channels (52-69) that were removed from broadcasting use as a result of the transition.

The station was granted a construction permit to increase its effective radiated power from 70 kW to 185 kW.

Coverage area 
WLJC-TV's digital signal covers much of eastern and central Kentucky as a result of its relatively high antenna position at 322 meters HAAT and a power level of 185,000 watts on the VHF band. Its primary coverage area includes the Lexington metropolitan area, London, and Hazard. Its fringe contour even reaches areas as far north as Maysville, as far east as Pikeville, as far west as Frankfort, and as far south as the Tennessee state line around Middlesboro.

External links
Official website

References

Television channels and stations established in 1982
1982 establishments in Kentucky
LJC-TV
Cozi TV affiliates
TheGrio affiliates
Antenna TV affiliates
GetTV affiliates
This TV affiliates
Start TV affiliates
Heroes & Icons affiliates
Beattyville, Kentucky